Floris Wortelboer (born 4 August 1996) is a Dutch field hockey player who plays as a defender or midfielder for Hoofdklasse club Bloemendaal and the Dutch national team.

Club career
Wortelboer first played football when he was young but when he was around seven years old he made the switch to hockey and started playing at the local hockey club Teteringen. He then made the switch to Push where he played from the under-12 teams until the first senior men's team. In 2017 he made the switch to Den Bosch where he signed for two seasons. After those two seasons he moved to Bloemendaal in 2019.

International career

Under–21
Wortelboer made his debut for the Netherlands U–21 team in 2015 during a test series in Breda.

The following year he went on to represent the team at the FIH Junior World Cup in Lucknow.

Oranje
Floris Wortelboer made his senior debut for the Oranje in 2017. He played his first international during the Summer Series in Cape Town. He went on to win his major medal with the team that year, taking home gold at the EuroHockey Championship in Amsterdam.

He went on to add two bronze medals to his collection. His first at the 2018 FIH Champions Trophy in Breda, as well as the 2019 FIH Pro League in Amsterdam.

References

External links
 
 

1996 births
Living people
Sportspeople from Breda
Dutch male field hockey players
Male field hockey defenders
Male field hockey midfielders
HC Den Bosch players
HC Bloemendaal players
Men's Hoofdklasse Hockey players
2023 Men's FIH Hockey World Cup players